Ninety One or 91 (Toqsan bır, Korean : 나인티원) is a Kazakh boy group formed by JUZ Entertainment in 2015.  The band consists of four members: Alem, Ace, Zaq, and Bala. Once a five-member group, A.Z. left in 2020. Ninety One is the pioneer act of a new musical genre called Q-pop (Qazaq-pop) which could be called a symbiosis of Western and Asian pop music. The group was produced by Yerbolat Bedelkhan, a member of the Kazakh music unit "Orda".

History

2014: KTI-boys 
The group was founded in 2014, based on the "K-Top Idols" project, the main goal of which was creating Kazakhstan's first idol group. A.Z. and ZaQ were the winners of this project. BALA and ALEM were cast via a separate audition. ACE joined the group after training for 2.5 years at the S.M. Entertainment agency in South Korea.

Q-POP 
The term "Q-pop" was first coined in 2015 by the fanbase of Ninety One - "Eaglez". Fans pointed out the differences they saw in a newly founded Asian pop genre compared to other countries pop music. The letter "Q" originates from the way country's name, "Qazaqstan", should be written according to the Latin script of Kazakh. The prefix ‘Q’ has a particular ideological connotation. Putting ‘Q’ as the prefix is a trendy way of representing new Kazakhstan. The new idea of ‘Q’ for resembling Kazakhstan was generally accepted by the masses.

Debut and hostility towards the group (2015–2016) 
After a year and a half, band decided to change their name to "Ninety One". The new name references the year 1991 when Kazakhstan won its independence from the former Soviet Union. The name "91" carries the meaning of independence and creative freedom.
On 1 September 2015 Ninety One released their debut single Aiyptama! (Айыптама). The music video for the song was released on October 8, 2015. Aıyptama! (according to the latest revision of the Kazakh alphabet it's spelled Aiyptama) led the charts of Kazakhstan's music channels for 20 weeks. On December 1, 2015, they released their first EP, also called Aıyptama. This mini-album consists of 6 songs.
On June 2, 2016, they released a music video for the song "Qaitadan", which is currently the chart leader on Gäkku TV.
Music video for "Qalay Qaraisyn" (Qalai Qaraisyñ'', English: How do you feel about that?), their third song, came out on 11 December 2016. Song was included into the soundtrack of the movie "Гламұр для дур" directed by Askar Uzabaev. The song lasted 20 weeks on the 1st place of the Gákký chart.

Public's response 
Ninety One, despite immediately winning the hearts of a young, mainly female, Kazakh audience, were met with a huge wave of hostility from the mainstream public. A lot of local celebrities openly bashed and humiliated them, going as far as to say Ninety One were corrupting their youth. Make-up, earrings and dyed hair on men were borderline offensive to the eye of a typical Kazakh. Group's style was considered against their mentality. And while having nothing against their music, local "activists", enraged by the group's appearance, tried everything in their power to bring the group down.
Apart from receiving various insults and death threats, Ninety One also had to physically defend themselves from some overzealous anti-fans.

First Tour "#91"
On 21 June 2016 Ninety One held their first solo concert in the city of Karaganda as a part of "#91" tour. 
A big number of group's concerts were cancelled due to the "public's" demand. Protests were held against the group. Staff members and Ninety One themselves couldn't enter the concert venues.
On 23 July and up until 5 August 2016 Ninety One and a music group Orda (that their producer is a part of) went together on tour around China. They gave an interview for a Kazakh magazine "Xalhar".

Second album and a movie (2017) 
On July 2 JUZ Entertainment announced Ninety One's second tour. JUZ Tour 2k17 was bigger and included even more cities. Tour was successful with no major interferences from anti-fans.

"Mooz" and the movie "91" 
"Mūz" (English: Ice/cold) came out on 21 August 2017. "Mooz" is an official OST to Ninety One's biographical movie "91". 
On 24 August, movie «91» was released. Directed by Askar Uzabaev and produced by Assel Sadvakasova and Yerbolat Bedelkhan, this movie has become an acting debut for the members who had to play themselves on the big screen.
"91" showcases the difficulties group has experienced: Ninety one's pre-debut and early debut days were marked by the huge backlash they've received from anti-fans and general public.
And while some people could argue that it's too early for the group to have a movie dedicated to their story, director Askar Uzabaev was confident that the movie needs to be shot. Director even managed to persuade the group's own producer - Yerbolat Bedelkhan, who once was opposed to the idea as well.
Movie "Ninety One" entered the top three Kazakhstani streaming products; for the premiere weekend movie collected 32,672,000 tenge.

"Dopamine" album and documentary (2018–2019) 
On the 25th of June, 2018 Ninety One released "E.Yeah", the first song of their new album "Dopamine", quickly followed by "All I need" released on 8 August.
The third song of the album - "Boyman", came out on 24 October. "Boyman" said to be a tribute to a famous Kazakhstani figure skater Denis Ten, whose death has deeply affected Ninety One members, as well as the whole of Kazakhstan.

International expansion 

On 15 March 2019 on the national Korean TV-channel MNET came out another episode of a popular musical game show "I can seee your voice" but this time around a Q-POP boy group Ninety One made their guest appearance. Group has won the show and got to perform with the popular K-POP group Mamamoo. At the end of the show, they've also performed their debut song "Aiyptama". After the show aired Ninety One released their song "Aiyptama" as an exclusive digital single on Korean musical streaming platforms. Also on summer in the same year they held their first ever concert in China.

Documentary "Петь свои песни" 
Documentary film by Katherine Suvorova "Петь свои песни" (Kazakh name: Men sen emes), looks into the reasons behind protests against the group and cancellations of their concerts. These events reveal a huge layer of social and cultural conflicts inside the Kazakhstani society - 
conflict between the urban and rural life, between traditionalism and globalization, between the vertical line of political authority and personal freedom.
Film explores these themes through conversations with the band members themselves, their opponents and supporters. Kazakhstani political and cultural scientists, media experts and art historians also explain why do people of Kazakhstan protest against Q-pop.

Social impact 
Ninety One have made a huge impact on the Kazakh language.
Despite receiving multiple recommendations to switch to English or Russian, members of Ninety One are certain that their actions help popularise their country and language.

On 29 March 2018 a member of Ninety One - ZAQ, who's a part of the youth party Жас Отан ("Zhas Otan"), gave a speech on the IV Congress of Zhas Otan.

Apart from the effects on the language, Ninety One and their producer - Yerbolat Bedelkhan have made a big impact on culture. Genre Q-pop is now considered the most popular musical direction amongst the youth in Kazakhstan.

Projects 

Producer of the group, with the help of a Kazakh TV channel , decided to create Kazakhstan's first rap show.
On 25 May 2018 came out the promotional video for "Qara beri". Members of Ninety One - Zaq and A.Z were mentors on the show.
As Yerbolat Bedelkhan said in his interview for NTK:

"- The main goal of the project is to show people of Kazakhstan that we do have hip-hop! That our youth can and wants to write rap in Kazakh. In the 21st century we need to prove that our language can be modern."

Rapper "Ne1tron", winner of the show, signed his contract with Juz Entertainment on the 21 February.

On May 1, 2019, Yerbolat Bedelkhan together with Salem social media announced a casting for the show "Project X".

"Project X" is a new reality survival show, main goal of which is to create the next boy group of Juz Entertainment. New group should give a healthy competition in the genre of Q-Pop.

Out of more than 2000 people that have applied for the show, only 400 people were invited to the offline casting.

First episode of the show came out on 27 May.

Members

Current
 Alem (Batyrkhan Abaıuly Málikov; Kazakh: Батырхан Абайұлы Мәлікoв, born February 18, 1993) – main vocalist, composer
 Ace (Azamat Qaıratuly Ashmaqyn; Kazakh: Қайратұлы Ашмақын, born August 29, 1993) – leader, vocalist, lead dancer, composer, visual
 Zaq (Dýlat Bolatuly Muhametqalı; Kazakh: Болатұлы Мұхаметқали, born February 8, 1996) – main rapper, main dancer, choreographer, lyricist
 Bala (Danııar Qulymshin; Kazakh: Құлымшин, born February 19, 1998) – lead vocalist, kenzhe(youngest), composer

Former
 A.Z. (Azamat Baıbýlatuly Zenkaev; Kazakh: Азамат Байбyлатұлы Зенкаев, born September 28, 1993) – leader, lead rapper, lyricist

Discography

Studio albums

Extended plays

Singles

Videography 
Music videos

External links

References

Kazakh pop music groups
Electronic dance music groups
Musical groups established in 2014
2014 establishments in Kazakhstan